Behalf  offers short-term financing with flexible repayment terms to U.S.-based small businesses, ranging between $300-$50,000. Behalf pays vendors directly, on behalf of the small business, for the purchase of goods or services. Behalf has headquarters in New York.

Behalf was founded in 2011 by Benjy Feinberg, Shai Feinberg, and Jeremy Esekow. In July 2015, Behalf raised $119 million from Mission OG, Sequoia Capital, Spark Capital, Maverick Ventures, and Victory Park Capital.

In January 2015, Behalf announced a partnership with MasterCard and Comdata. This partnership enables small business financing with almost any vendor that accepts MasterCard.

As of February 2016, the Better Business Bureau rates Behalf as A+.

References

External Resources
Company website

Financial services companies of the United States
Loans
Microfinance
Financial services companies based in New York City